Naud Junction was an area in northern Downtown Los Angeles, California.  It was located at the junction of Main Street and Alameda Street, where Southern Pacific Railroad trains veered off Alameda to tracks along Alhambra Avenue and the Los Angeles River.

History
It is named for French-American warehouseman Edouard Naud, who built a warehouse at the junction in 1878.  Naud Junction was marked by a signal tower built at Alameda and Ord streets in 1898. This was torn down in 1940, after Union Station was built.

Boxing pavilion
From 1905 to 1913, Naud Junction was the location of the city of Los Angeles' primary boxing pavilion, which was built by promoter Thomas McCarey.  The pavilion paid host to both the world middleweight championship between Hugo Kelly and Tommy Burns, a heavyweight championship bout between Burns and Marvin Hart, and a featherweight championship bout between Abe Attell and Frankie Nell.  

It was also witness to a Billy Sunday crusade in 1909.

References

Neighborhoods in Los Angeles
Downtown Los Angeles
Defunct boxing venues in the United States
Central Los Angeles
Northwest Los Angeles
Boxing venues in Los Angeles